Vanuatu competed at the 2000 Summer Paralympics in Sydney. The country made its Paralympic début by sending two athletes to compete in javelin events. Neither won a medal.

Athletics

See also
 2000 Summer Paralympics
 Vanuatu at the Paralympics
 Vanuatu at the 2000 Summer Olympics

External links
 International Paralympic Committee
 Vanuatu Paralympic Committee

References

Nations at the 2000 Summer Paralympics
2008
Paralympics